In abstract algebra, cohomological dimension is an invariant of a group which measures the homological complexity of its representations. It has important applications in geometric group theory, topology, and algebraic number theory.

Cohomological dimension of a group 

As most cohomological invariants, the cohomological dimension involves a choice of a "ring of coefficients" R, with a prominent special case given by R = Z, the ring of integers. Let G be a discrete group, R a non-zero ring with a unit, and RG the group ring. The group G has cohomological dimension less than or equal to n, denoted cdR(G) ≤ n, if the trivial RG-module R has a projective resolution of length n, i.e. there are projective RG-modules P0, ..., Pn and RG-module homomorphisms dk: PkPk − 1 (k = 1, ..., n) and d0: P0R, such that the image of dk coincides with the kernel of dk − 1 for k = 1, ..., n and the kernel of dn is trivial.

Equivalently, the cohomological dimension is less than or equal to n if for an arbitrary RG-module M, the cohomology of G with coefficients in M vanishes in degrees k > n, that is, Hk(G,M) = 0 whenever k > n.  The p-cohomological dimension for prime p is similarly defined in terms of the p-torsion groups Hk(G,M){p}.

The smallest n such that the cohomological dimension of G is less than or equal to n is the cohomological dimension of G (with coefficients R), which is denoted .

A free resolution of  can be obtained from a free action of the group G on a contractible topological space X. In particular, if X is a contractible CW complex of dimension n with a free action of a discrete group G that permutes the cells, then .

Examples 
In the first group of examples, let the ring R of coefficients be .
 A free group has cohomological dimension one. As shown by John Stallings (for finitely generated group) and Richard Swan (in full generality), this property characterizes free groups. This result is known as the Stallings–Swan theorem. The Stallings-Swan theorem for a group G says that G is free if and only if every extension by G with abelian kernel is split.
 The fundamental group of a compact, connected, orientable Riemann surface other than the sphere has cohomological dimension two.
 More generally, the fundamental group of a closed, connected, orientable aspherical manifold of dimension n has cohomological dimension n. In particular, the fundamental group of a closed orientable hyperbolic n-manifold has cohomological dimension n.
More generally, the same is true for groups with nontrivial torsion.

Now consider the case of a general ring R.
 A group G has cohomological dimension 0 if and only if its group ring RG is semisimple. Thus a finite group has cohomological dimension 0 if and only if its order (or, equivalently, the orders of its elements) is invertible in R.

Cohomological dimension of a field
The p-cohomological dimension of a field K is the p-cohomological dimension of the Galois group of a separable closure of K.  The cohomological dimension of K is the supremum of the p-cohomological dimension over all primes p.

Examples
 Every field of non-zero characteristic p has p-cohomological dimension at most 1.

See also 
 Eilenberg−Ganea conjecture
 Group cohomology
 Global dimension

References 

 
 
 
 
 
   
 
 

Group theory
Homological algebra